The 2019 IIHF World Championship Division I was an international ice hockey tournament run by the International Ice Hockey Federation.

The Group A tournament was held in Nur-Sultan, Kazakhstan from 29 April to 5 May 2019 and the Group B tournament in Tallinn, Estonia from 28 April to 4 May 2019.

Belarus and Kazakhstan gained promotion to the top division, while Romania was promoted to Group A next year. Lithuania and the Netherlands were relegated to Group B and Division II by finishing last in their tournaments.

Group A tournament

Participants

Match officials
7 referees and 7 linesmen were selected for the tournament.

Standings

Results
All times are local (UTC+6).

Awards and statistics

Awards
Best players selected by the directorate:
Best Goaltender:  Matt Dalton
Best Defenseman:  Darren Dietz
Best Forward:  Geoff Platt
Source: IIHF.com

Media All-Stars:
 MVP:  Nikita Mikhailis
 Goaltender:  Matt Dalton
 Defenceman:  Darren Dietz /  Leonid Metalnikov
 Forwards:  Nikita Mikhailis /  Geoff Platt /  Kim Sang-wook
Source: IIHF.com

Scoring leaders
List shows the top skaters sorted by points, then goals.

GP = Games played; G = Goals; A = Assists; Pts = Points; +/− = Plus/minus; PIM = Penalties in minutes; POS = Position
Source: IIHF.com

Goaltending leaders
Only the top five goaltenders, based on save percentage, who have played at least 40% of their team's minutes, are included in this list.

TOI = Time on Ice (minutes:seconds); SA = Shots against; GA = Goals against; GAA = Goals against average; Sv% = Save percentage; SO = Shutouts
Source: IIHF.com

Group B tournament

Participants

Match officials
4 referees and 7 linesmen were selected for the tournament.

Standings

Results
All times are local (UTC+3).

Awards and statistics

Awards
Best players selected by the directorate:
Best Goaltender:  Patrik Polc
Best Defenseman:  Pavlo Borysenko
Best Forward:  Patryk Wronka
Source: IIHF

Scoring leaders
List shows the top skaters sorted by points, then goals.

GP = Games played; G = Goals; A = Assists; Pts = Points; +/− = Plus/minus; PIM = Penalties in minutes; POS = Position
Source: IIHF.com

Goaltending leaders
Only the top five goaltenders, based on save percentage, who have played at least 40% of their team's minutes, are included in this list.

TOI = Time on Ice (minutes:seconds); SA = Shots against; GA = Goals against; GAA = Goals against average; Sv% = Save percentage; SO = Shutouts
Source: IIHF.com

References

External links
Group A website
Group B website

2019
Division I
2019 IIHF World Championship Division I
2019 IIHF World Championship Division I
Sport in Astana
Sports competitions in Tallinn
2019 in Kazakhstani sport
2019 in Estonian sport
April 2019 sports events in Europe
May 2019 sports events in Europe